Glacier mice are colonies of mosses found on some glaciers and adjacent ecosystems. They are composed of multiple species of moss and can also host other species, such as nematode worms, springtails, and water bears. Although what preconditions are necessary for glacier mice to form has yet to be determined, they have been observed in Alaska, Chile, Greenland, Iceland, Svalbard, Uganda and Venezuela, as well as several Subantarctic islands. In at least some cases, glacier mice apparently reproduce asexually due to the effect of the harsh glacier environment on traditional moss reproduction strategies.

Glacier mice are notable for their movement across the ice, which appears to be non-random, taking the form of herd-like behavior. This movement is as yet unexplained, and does not appear to be solely the product of wind or the direction of a slope. The use of accelerometers has demonstrated that glacier mice do in fact rotate and roll, rather than simply sliding across the ice, over time exposing all of their surfaces. Measurements of glacier mice show that they retain heat and moisture, creating a suitable ecosystem for microorganisms that otherwise could not live on a glacier. Glacier mice are believed to persist for six years or longer.

References

External links
 
 
 
 The Natural History Museum, London: 

Glaciers
Mosses